John Whitehead (fl. 1389–1415) was an Irish theologian.

A native of Ireland, Whitehead studied at Oxford where in 1408 he is referred to as a Doctor of Theology. Up to 1415 he was rector of Stabannan, County Louth. Like Henry Crumpe and Richard FitzRalph he was involved in sermonical attacks upon the Franciscan friars. He attended the 1409 Council of Pisa as proctor of the Archbishop Fleming of Armagh.

His works include:
Determinacio in materia de mendicitate/Assessment in the matter of mendicant poverty
Determinacio de confessione et absolucione/Assessment concerning confession and absolution

See also
Thomas de Hibernia
Master Patrick of Ireland
John Clyn

Sources
A New History of Ireland, volume one.

Alumni of The Queen's College, Oxford
Irish writers
Irish Roman Catholic theologians
14th-century Irish Roman Catholic priests
15th-century Irish Roman Catholic priests
People from County Louth
14th-century births
15th-century deaths
14th-century Roman Catholic theologians
15th-century Roman Catholic theologians
15th-century Irish writers
Irish Latinists